Otto Tangen (28 January 1886 – 13 October 1956) was a Norwegian Nordic skier who shared the Holmenkollen medal in 1911 with Knut Holst.

References
Holmenkollen medalists - click Holmenkollmedaljen for downloadable pdf file 

Holmenkollen medalists
1886 births
1956 deaths